Ocean Productions, Inc., is a Canadian media production and voice acting company based in Vancouver, British Columbia, that is part of the Ocean Group of businesses. Ocean Group is involved in intellectual property acquisition and development, co-production and the creation of English versions of animation for worldwide distribution.

The Group also works with global toy companies and producers to create and distribute animation properties in conjunction with game development as well as licensing and merchandising programs.

Ocean Media Inc. creates world master versions of programming to promote intellectual properties on a global basis. The company's productions are recorded at Ocean Studios (originally known as Ocean Sound) in Vancouver and Blue Water Studios in Calgary and Edmonton, Alberta.

History
Founded by Ken Morrison and Dave Thomas in the early 1970s, the company, then known as Ocean Sound, originally started as a North Vancouver-based music recording studio. Musicians such as Art Bergmann, Chilliwack, D.O.A and k.d. lang recorded albums and songs there.

In 1979, Ocean moved to its current location in the Kitsilano community. Sometime after, the company began producing voice over work for animation. By the late 1990s, Ocean claimed to control about 85% of the market for animation voice-over in Vancouver. During this time, Ocean was one of the largest production houses working on English-language versions of Japanese anime series. Among others, the company's clients included Bandai Entertainment, Central Park Media, Geneon Entertainment and Viz Media.

Ocean now works on animation and live action media from around the world.

List of works

Ocean Studios
These series were produced at Ocean Studios in Vancouver, British Columbia.

Live action
 Dark Soldier D
 Death Note
 Death Note 2: The Last Name
 If I Were an Animal
 L: Change the World
 Ultraman Zearth
 Ultraman Zearth 2: Superhuman War

Western animation

 A Monkey's Tale
 A New Kind of Magic
 Animated Classic Showcase
 Asterix: The Mansions of the Gods
 Asterix: The Secret of the Magic Potion
 Bibi and Tina
 Billy the Cat
 Capertown Cops
 Coach Me if You Can
 Conan the Adventurer
 Cosmic Quantum Ray
 Cybersix
 Dive Olly Dive and the Octopus Rescue
 Exosquad
 Fantastic Four: World's Greatest Heroes
 Heroes on Hot Wheels
 Hulk vs. Thor
 Hulk vs. Wolverine
 Iron Man: Armored Adventures
 Kong: The Animated Series
 The Little Prince
 Mega Man
 Mr. Magoo
 Mune: Guardian of the Moon
 NASCAR Racers
 Next Avengers: Heroes of Tomorrow
 The New Adventures Of Peter Pan
 Norm of the North: Family Vacation
 Norm of the North: Keys to the Kingdom
 Norm of the North: King Sized Adventure
 Planet Hulk
 Robin and the Dreamweavers
 Rock Dog 2: Rock Around The Park
 Roswell Conspiracies: Aliens, Myths and Legends
 Sabrina: Secrets of a Teenage Witch
 Skysurfer Strike Force
 Spiff and Hercules
 Street Fighter
 Strawberry Shortcake's Berry Bitty Adventures
 Tara Duncan
 Thor: Tales of Asgard
 Troll Tales
 The True Adventures of Professor Thompson
 Ultimate Book of Spells
 Waldo's Way
 We're Lalaloopsy
 Worry Eaters
 X-Men: Evolution

International animation
 Biklonz (Young Toys)
 Mysteries and Feluda
 Flash and Dash
 L.O.R.D: Legend of Ravaging Dynasties
 Mix Master (MoonScoop Group)
 Super Kid (UM Productions)
 Tobot (Young Toys)
 Tobot Athlon (Young Toys)
 Tobot: Galaxy Detectives (Young Toys)

Anime

 .hack//Roots (Bandai Entertainment)
 A Chinese Ghost Story (Viz Media)
 Ayakashi: Samurai Horror Tales (Geneon)
 Awol: Absent Without Leave (Bandai Entertainment)
 B-Daman Fireblast (ADK Emotions NY, Inc.)
 Beyblade Burst (ADK Emotions NY, Inc.)
 Beyblade Burst Evolution (ADK Emotions NY, Inc.)
 Black Lagoon (Geneon)
 Black Lagoon: Roberta's Blood Trail (Funimation)
 Boys Over Flowers (Viz Media)
 Brain Powered (Bandai Entertainment)
 Cardcaptor Sakura (Nelvana, under the name Cardcaptors)
 Cardcaptor Sakura: The Movie (Geneon/Nelvana, under the name Cardcaptors: The Movie)
 The Daichis: Earth Defence Family (Geneon)
 Death Note (Viz Media)
 Dog Soldier (Central Park Media)
 Dokkoida?! (Geneon)
 Dragon Ball Z (Funimation/Saban (Episodes 1-67 [edited into 53 episodes]), Westwood Media (Episodes 123-291))
 Dragon Ball Z: Dead Zone (Funimation/Geneon)
 Dragon Ball Z: The Tree of Might (Funimation/Saban (edited into 3 episodes), Funimation/Geneon (uncut redub))
 Dragon Ball Z: The World's Strongest (Funimation/Geneon)
 Dragon Ball Z Kai (Episodes 1-98 (unreleased))
 Dragon Drive (Bandai Entertainment)
 Dragon Quest: The Adventure of Dai (2020) (Toei Animation)
 Eat-Man '98 (Bandai Entertainment)
 Earth Maiden Arjuna (Bandai Entertainment)
 Elemental Gelade (Geneon)
 Ehrgeiz (Bandai Entertainment)
 Escaflowne: The Movie (Bandai Entertainment)
 Fatal Fury: Legend of the Hungry Wolf (Viz Media)
 Fatal Fury 2: The New Battle (Viz Media)
 Fatal Fury: The Motion Picture (Viz Media)
 Future Boy Conan (Nippon Animation)
 Galaxy Angel (Bandai Entertainment)
 Ghost in the Shell: Stand Alone Complex - The Laughing Man (Bandai Entertainment)
 Ghost in the Shell: Stand Alone Complex - Individual Eleven (Bandai Entertainment)
 Gintama (Crunchyroll)
 The Girl Who Leapt Through Time (Bandai Entertainment)
 Green Legend Ran (Geneon)
 Grey: The Digital Target (Viz Media)
 Gundam Wing: Endless Waltz (Sunrise/Bandai Entertainment)
 The Hakkenden (Geneon)
 The Humanoid (OVA)|The Humanoid (Central Park Media)
 Hamtaro (Viz Media/Sho Pro Entertainment)
 Highlander: The Search for Vengeance (Manga Entertainment)
 Hikaru No Go (Viz Media)
 Human Crossing (Geneon)
 Infinite Ryvius (Bandai Entertainment)
 InuYasha (Sunrise/Viz Media)
 InuYasha: The Final Act (Sunrise/Viz Media)
 Jin-Roh (Bandai Entertainment/Viz Media)
 Junkers Come Here (Bandai Entertainment)
 Key the Metal Idol (Viz Media)
 Kishin Corps (Geneon)
 Kiznaiver (Crunchyroll)
 Kurozuka (Sony Pictures)
 Let's Go Quintuplets!
 Little Battlers eXperience (Dentsu)
 Maison Ikkoku (Viz Media)
 Master Keaton (Geneon)
 Meltylancer: The Animation (Bandai Entertainment)
 Mega Man (Dentsu Entertainment/Toei Animation)
 MegaMan NT Warrior (Viz Media/Sho Pro Entertainment)
 Mermaid's Scar (Viz Media)
 Mobile Suit Gundam (Sunrise/Bandai Entertainment)
 Mobile Suit Gundam 00 (Sunrise/Bandai Entertainment)
 Mobile Suit Gundam 00 the Movie: A Wakening of the Trailblazer (with Blue Water Studios) (Sunrise/Bandai Entertainment)
 Mobile Suit Gundam: Char's Counterattack (Sunrise/Bandai Entertainment)
 Mobile Suit Gundam SEED (Sunrise/Bandai Entertainment)
 Mobile Suit Gundam SEED Destiny (Sunrise/Bandai Entertainment)
 Mobile Suit Gundam Wing (Sunrise/Bandai Entertainment)
 Monkey Magic (Bandai Entertainment)
 Monster Rancher (Bohbot Entertainment)
 Nana (Viz Media)
 Night Warriors: Darkstalkers' Revenge (Viz Media)
 Ogre Slayer (Viz Media)
 Please Save My Earth (Viz Media)
 Popotan (Geneon)
 Powerpuff Girls Z (Turner Entertainment)
 Project A-ko 2: Plot of the Daitokuji Financial Group (Central Park Media)
 Project A-ko 3: Cinderella Rhapsody (Central Park Media)
 Project A-ko 4: FINAL (Central Park Media)
 Project A-ko: Grey Side/Blue Side (Central Park Media)
 Project ARMS (Viz Media)
 Ranma ½ (Viz Media)
 Ronin Warriors (Cinar/Bandai Entertainment)
 Saber Marionette J (Bandai Entertainment) 
 Sanctuary (Viz Media)
 Shakugan no Shana (Season One: Geneon)
 Silent Mobius (Bandai Entertainment)
 Sinbad: A Flying Princess and a Secret Island (Nippon Animation)
 Sinbad: Night at High Noon and the Wonder Gate (Nippon Animation)
 Sinbad: The Magic Lamp and the Moving Islands (Nippon Animation)
 The SoulTaker (Geneon)
 Sword of the Stranger (Bandai Entertainment)
 Star Ocean EX (Geneon)
 Starship Operators (Geneon)
 The Story of Saiunkoku (Geneon)
 Tenamonya Voyagers (Bandai Entertainment)
 Tetsujin 28 (Geneon)
 The New Adventures of Kimba The White Lion (Pioneer Home Entertainment)
 Tico and Friends (Cloverway Inc.)
 Trouble Chocolate (Viz Media)
 Tokyo Underground (Geneon)
 Ultimate Teacher (Central Park Media)
 Ultraviolet: Code 044 (Sony Pictures)
 Video Girl Ai (Viz Media)
 The Vision of Escaflowne (Bandai Entertainment)
 World Trigger (Toei Animation)
 Zoids: New Century (Viz Media)
Zoids Wild (Allspark Animation)
 Z-Mind (Bandai Entertainment)

Video games
 Dynasty Warriors Gundam series (Bandai Namco Games)
 Gundam Battle Assault (Bandai Namco Games)
 InuYasha: Feudal Combat (Bandai Namco Games)
 InuYasha: The Secret of the Cursed Mask (Bandai Namco Games)
 Kessen (Koei) 
 Little Battlers eXperience (Level-5)
 Mega Man Battle Network 5: Double Team (Capcom)
 Mobile Suit Gundam: Federation vs. Zeon (Bandai Namco Games)
 Mobile Suit Gundam: Encounters in Space (Bandai Namco Games)
 Mobile Suit Gundam: Journey to Jaburo (Bandai Namco Games)
 Mobile Suit Gundam: Never Ending Tomorrow (Bandai Namco Games)
 Monkey Magic (Sunsoft)
 Zoids Wild: Blast Unleashed (Outright Games)

Blue Water Studios
These series were recorded at Blue Water Studios in Calgary and Edmonton, Alberta.

Western animation
 Benjamin Blumchen
 Bibi Blocksberg
 Cyboars
 Jungo
 Lalaloopsy
 Lala-Oppsies: A Sew Magical Tale
 Lalaloopsy Ponies: The Big Show
 Lalaloopsy Babies: First Steps
 Lalaloopsy: Festival of Sugary Sweets
 Lalaloopsy Band Together
 Micropolis (Wyvern Images)
 Pfffirates (Xilam)
 Ralf the Record Rat
 Peter Swift and the Little Circus
 Tomato Twins
 Troll Tales
 The Wheelers (Wyvern Images)
 Weebles

International animation
  (CJ E&M) (Tooniverse)
 Krazzy Planet (Animatzione Production)
 Keymon Ache (DQ Entertainment)
 Kongsuni and Friends (Young Toys)
 Metalions (Young Toys)
 Super 10 (Young Toys)

Anime

 Angel Links (Bandai Entertainment)
 B-Daman Fireblast (Sunrights Inc.)
 Banner of the Stars (Bandai Entertainment)
 Betterman (Bandai Entertainment)
 Cardfight!! Vanguard (Bushiroad)
 Cardfight!! Vanguard: Asia Circuit (Bushiroad)
 Cardfight!! Vanguard: Link Joker (Bushiroad)
 Cardfight!! Vanguard G (Bushiroad)
 Cardfight!! Vanguard G: GIRS Crisis (Bushiroad)
 Cardfight!! Vanguard G: Stride Gate (Bushiroad)
 Cardfight!! Vanguard G: NEXT (Bushiroad)
 Cardfight!! Vanguard G: Z (Bushiroad)
 Cardfight!! Vanguard (2018) (Bushiroad)
 Cardfight!! Vanguard: High School Arc Cont. (Bushiroad)
 Cardfight!! Vanguard: Shinemon (Bushiroad)
 Cardfight!! Vanguard overDress (Bushiroad)
 Cardfight!! Vanguard Will+Dress (Bushiroad)
 Ceres, Celestial Legend (Viz Media)
 Crest of the Stars (Bandai Entertainment)
 Deko Boko Friends (Viz Media) 
 Deltora Quest (Dentsu)
 D.I.C.E. (Bandai Entertainment)
 Di Gi Charat Nyo (Bandai Entertainment)
 Doki Doki School Hours (Geneon)
 Dragon Ball (Westwood Media)
 Dragon Ball GT (Westwood Media)
 Fancy Lala (Bandai Entertainment)
 Flame of Recca (Viz Media)
 Full Moon o Sagashite (Viz Media)
 Future Card Buddyfight (Bushiroad)
 Future Card Buddyfight 100 (Bushiroad)
 Future Card Buddyfight X (Bushiroad)
 Future Card Buddyfight X All-Star Fight (Bushiroad)
 Future Card Buddyfight Ace (Bushiroad)
 Gregory Horror Show (Geneon)
 Hoop Days (Bandai Entertainment)
 Hunter x Hunter (Viz Media)
 Jubei-chan: The Ninja Girl (Bandai Entertainment)
 Jubei-chan 2 (Geneon)
 Kiznaiver (Crunchyroll)
 The Law of Ueki (Geneon)
 Little Battlers eXperience (Dentsu)
 My-Hime (Bandai Entertainment)
 My-Otome (Bandai Entertainment)
 Mobile Fighter G Gundam (Sunrise/Bandai Entertainment)
 Mobile Suit Zeta Gundam (Sunrise/Bandai Entertainment)
 Pretty Cure (Toei)
 Saber Marionette J to X (Bandai Entertainment)
 Scan2Go (Cookie Jar Entertainment)
 Strawberry Marshmallow (Geneon)
 Viper's Creed (Sony Pictures)
 Tide-Line Blue (Bandai Entertainment)
 World Trigger (Toei Animation)
 Zoids: Chaotic Century (Viz Media)

Video games
 Crimson Tears (Capcom)
 Dead Rivals (Gameloft)
 D.I.C.E. (Bandai Namco Games)
 Dynasty Warriors Gundam series (Bandai Namco Games)
 Gundam Battle Assault (Bandai Namco Games)
 Gregory Horror Show (Capcom)
 InuYasha: Feudal Combat (Bandai Namco Games)
 InuYasha: The Secret of the Cursed Mask (Bandai Namco Games)
 Little Battlers eXperience (Level-5)
 Mega Man: Powered Up (Capcom)
 Mega Man: Maverick Hunter X (Capcom)
 Mega Man X: Command Mission (Capcom)
 Mega Man X8 (Capcom)
 Mobile Suit Gundam: Federation vs. Zeon (Bandai Namco Games)
 Mobile Suit Gundam: Journey to Jaburo (Bandai Namco Games)
 Mobile Suit Gundam: Never Ending Tomorrow (Bandai Namco Games)
 Order & Chaos 2: Redemption (Gameloft)
 We Love Golf!'' (Capcom)

See also 

 Playism
 vidby
 Deepl

Notes

References

External links
 Ocean Productions at the CrystalAcids Anime Voice Actor Database
 Ocean Media website
 Blue Water Studios website
 Chinook Animation Productions website

1974 establishments in British Columbia
Anime companies
Canadian animation studios
Canadian companies established in 1974
Companies based in Vancouver
Dubbing studios
Mass media companies established in 1974
Ocean Studios